Lactifluus aureifolius is a species of agaric fungus in the family Russulaceae. It is found in Burundi, which grows in miombo woodland dominated by Brachystegia utilis. The fungus was described in 1996 as a species of Lactarius.

Taxonomy
The species was originally described as Lactarius aureifolius by Annameike Verbeken in 1996. She transferred the species to Lactifluus in 2011. It is classified in the subgenus Edules.

Description
The distantly spaced gills have an adnate to somewhat decurrent attachment to the stem. Spores are ellipsoidal, measuring 6.7–7.6–8.6 by 5.7–6.3–6.9 μm.

See also
List of Lactifluus species

References

External links

Fungi described in 1996
Fungi of Africa
aureifolius